John Greenwood (May 17, 1760 – November 16, 1819) was an American fifer and dentist, serving as George Washington's personal dentist. He was responsible for designing Washington's famous dentures, which were not wood but carved from hippopotamus tusk. He invented the first known "dental foot engine" in 1790.

Greenwood served as a fifer during the American Revolutionary War at sixteen years of age. He served twenty months in Captain Theodore Bliss's company of the 26th Massachusetts Regiment, playing the fife in the Continental Army from 1775 to 1778. He was the grandson of Isaac Greenwood, a mathematics professor at Harvard, and son of Isaac Greenwood, the first native-born American dentist.

A letter from John Greenwood to Lt. General George Washington on his denture charges, dated 1799, is in the A.D. Black History of Dentistry Collection at Northwestern University.

American Revolutionary War

Greenwood was born on May 17, 1760 in Boston, and lived there for most of his early life. Living a “troubled” childhood, Greenwood had become close friends with Samuel Maverick, a seventeen-year-old victim of the Boston Massacre. He was excited by the musical sounds of the British regulars which had occupied Boston and later learned to play several tunes on the fife. At sixteen, however, he was sent to Falmouth, Maine, to live with his uncle.

On April 19, 1775, the first shots of the American Revolutionary War were fired at the Battles of Lexington and Concord. In May, Greenwood heard the news and alone walked  from Falmouth to Boston, occasionally stopping at taverns to play music for soldiers. Writing in his autobiography, he claimed that when he was asked what he was doing he said, “I was going to fight for my country”.
A few months later in June, the Americans had lost the Battle of Bunker Hill and the British were able to establish encampments in that area north of Charlestown. Greenwood had heard of this whilst walking through Cambridge, west of the battle. He witnessed struggling wounded men returning to Cambridge on foot, which discouraged him from continuing any more service. He was, however, encouraged to continue after apparently witnessing a wounded black soldier, who planned to return to battle after fixing his injuries.

References

External links
Music book given to John Greenwood, ca. 1780 | New-York Historical Society Digital Collections 
History of Dentistry at Dr. Juggles.
Greenwood Family Crest

1760 births
1819 deaths
American dentists
People from Boston
People from Falmouth, Maine